North Washington may refer to a place in the United States:

North Washington, Colorado
North Washington, Iowa
North Washington, Maine